The Northern Carleton Memorial Hospital was an acute care hospital located in Bath, New Brunswick,  Canada.

It closed in the fall of 2007 as part of a consolidation of health care services in Carleton County and adjacent areas, that saw the opening of a new regional hospital, the Upper River Valley Hospital.

References
"Transition smooth to new N.B. hospital; Workers settling in to $85M Upper River Valley Hospital" The Times - Transcript; Moncton, N.B. 17 Dec 2007: A9.

Hospitals in New Brunswick
Defunct hospitals in Canada
Buildings and structures in Carleton County, New Brunswick
Hospitals disestablished in 2007
2007 disestablishments in New Brunswick